Baoyi Qaghan or Alp Bilge Qaghan was the eighth ruler of Uyghurs. His personal name is not known, therefore he is often referred as his Tang dynasty invested title Baoyi which was invested on 22 June 808.

Reign 
He was known as a zealous Manichean ruler and militarily active ruler. He demanded a Chinese Princess from Xianzong of Tang by sending his minister Inanchu Külüg Chigshi on 24 June 810, a request that was refused. Xianzong's reason was expenses involved. Xianzong asked Manichean priests to pursue Baoyi to drop request. Baoyi used this opportunity to occupy Tiquan (鵜泉) in April 813. Xianzong's Minister of Rites Li Jiang suspected that Baoyi would make peace with Tibetan Empire in order to invade China. He suggested that Baoyi's proposal of having a Tang princess marry should be accepted, to further affirm the alliance between Tang and Uyghurs. His suggestion, however, was not accepted.

His request was only realized when he sent Ulu Tarkhan (Hedagan 合達干) to Emperor Muzong, who married off his sister Princess Yong'an (永安公主) in 821. However, the qaghan soon died after marriage. He was succeeded by his son Chongde Qaghan.

Family 
He had at least 4 sons:

Chongde Qaghan
Zhaoli Qaghan
Wujie Qaghan
Enian Qaghan

Legacy 
He is famous for commission of trilingual (Chinese, Old Turkic, Sogdian) Karabalgasun inscription in Ordu-Baliq.

References 

821 deaths
9th-century monarchs in Asia
9th-century Turkic people
Ädiz clan
Manichaeans